Danaë is a 1631–1633 oil on canvas painting by French artist Jacques Blanchard, now in the Musée des Beaux-Arts de Lyon in France. It shows Danaë receiving Jupiter in the form of a shower of gold, a union that results in the birth of Perseus.

Blanchard is also thought to have painted another Danaë, this one part of the Suida-Manning Collection acquired in 1998 by the Blanton Art Museum in Austin, Texas. The attribution was made after a restoration of the painting c. 2012 uncovered a previously painted-over putto and an image of Jupiter, which not only identified the mythological subject, but bore stylistic markers of Blanchard's work. In 1992, art historian William R. Crelly had suggested that Virginia da Vezzo (the wife of Simon Vouet) painted the Blanton Danaë. Even after the restoration, as recently as 2013, art historian Guillaume Kazerouni has disputed the Blanchard attribution and repeated the suggestion that the Blanton Danaë may be the work of Virginia da Vezzo.

References

Bibliography
Jacques Blanchard, catalogue exposition Rennes 6 mars au 8 juin 1998 Jacques Thuillier

1630s paintings
French paintings
Paintings in the collection of the Museum of Fine Arts of Lyon
Blanchard
Nude art
Angels in art